Sheal S. Mulyata is a member of the National Assembly of Zambia.

Mulyata was elected in 2016 and 2021 for Rufunsa.

Mulyata is a United Party for National Development politician. She was placed as the Provincial Minister for Lusaka Province in September 2021.

References

1960 births
Members of the National Assembly of Zambia
United Party for National Development politicians
People from Rufunsa District
Living people